Armillaria mellea, commonly known as honey fungus, is a basidiomycete fungus in the genus Armillaria. It is a plant pathogen and part of a cryptic species complex of closely related and morphologically similar species. It causes Armillaria root rot in many plant species and produces mushrooms around the base of trees it has infected. The symptoms of infection appear in the crowns of infected trees as discoloured foliage, reduced growth, dieback of the branches and death. The mushrooms are edible but some people may be intolerant to them. This species is capable of producing light via bioluminescence in its mycelium.

Armillaria mellea is widely distributed in temperate regions of the Northern Hemisphere. The fruit body or mushroom, commonly known as stump mushroom, stumpie, honey mushroom, pipinky or pinky, grows typically on hardwoods but may be found around and on other living and dead wood or in open areas.

Taxonomy

The species was originally named Agaricus melleus by Danish-Norwegian botanist Martin Vahl in 1790; it was transferred to the genus Armillaria in 1871 by Paul Kummer. Numerous subtaxa have been described:

Similar species
Armillaria mellea once included a range of species with similar features that have since been reclassified. The following are reassigned subtaxa, mostly variety-level entries from the 19th century:

Description

The basidiocarp of each has a smooth cap  in diameter, convex at first but becoming flattened with age often with a central raised umbo, later becoming somewhat dish-shaped. The margins of the cap are often arched at maturity and the surface is sticky when wet. Though typically honey-coloured, this fungus is rather variable in appearance and sometimes has a few dark, hairy scales near the centre somewhat radially arranged. The gills are white at first, sometimes becoming pinkish-yellow or discoloured with age, broad and fairly distant, attached to the stipe at right angles or are slightly decurrent. It is fibrillose and of a firm spongy consistency at first but later becomes hollow. It is cylindrical and tapers to a point at its base where it is fused to the stipes of other mushrooms in the clump. It is whitish at the upper end and brownish-yellow below, often with a very dark-coloured base. There is a broad persistent skin-like ring attached to the upper part of the stipe. This has a velvety margin and yellowish fluff underneath and extends outwards as a white partial veil protecting the gills when young. The flesh of the cap is whitish and has a sweetish odour and flavour with a tinge of bitterness. Under the microscope, the spores are approximately elliptical, 7–9 by 6–7 μm, inamyloid with prominent apiculi (short, pointed projections) at the base. The spore print is white. The basidia (spore-producing structures) lack basal clamps.

The main part of the fungus is underground where a mat of mycelial threads may extend for great distances. They are bundled together in rhizomorphs that are black in this species. The fungal body is not bioluminescent but its mycelia are luminous when in active growth.

Hosts and symptoms 
Armillaria mellea typically infects hardwood trees and conifers but sometimes will infect non-woody monocots and a few herbaceous plants. There are few signs, and the ones that do exist are often hard to find. The most prominent sign is honey-colored mushrooms at the base of the infected plant. Additional signs include white, fan-shaped mycelia and black rhizomorphs with diameters between 1/32nd of an inch and 1/8th of an inch. These usually are not as noticeable because they occur beneath the bark and in the soil, respectively. The symptoms are much more numerous, including slower growth, dieback of branches, yellowing foliage, rotted wood at base and/or roots, external cankers, cracking bark, bleeding stem, leaf wilting, defoliation, and rapid death. Leaf wilting, defoliation, and dieback occur after the destruction of the cambium.

Disease cycle 
Armillaria mellea infects both through basidiospore and penetration of host species by rhizomorphs which can grow up to 10 feet long to find new, living tissue to infect. However, infection of living host tissue through basidiospores is quite rare. Two basidiospores must germinate and fuse to be viable and produce mycelium. In the late summer and autumn, Armillaria mellea produces mushrooms with notched gills, a ring near the cap base, and a white to golden color. They don't always appear, but when they do they can be found on both living and dead trees near the ground. These mushrooms produce and release the sexually created basidiospore which is dispersed by the wind. This is the only spore-bearing phase. The fungus overwinters as either rhizomorphs or vegetative mycelium. Infected wood is weakened through decay in roots and tree base after destruction of the vascular cambium and underlying wood.

Environment 
Armillaria mellea prefers moist soil and lower soil temperatures but it can also withstand extreme temperatures, such as forest fires, due to the protection of the soil. It is found in many kinds of landscapes, including gardens, parks, vineyards, tree production areas, and natural landscapes.

Distribution
Armillaria mellea is widespread in northern temperate zones. It has been found in North America, Europe and northern Asia, and It has been introduced to South Africa. The fungus grows parasitically on a large number of broadleaf trees.  It fruits in dense clusters at the base of trunks or stumps.

Ecology

Trees become infected by Armillaria mellea when rhizomorphs growing through the soil encounter uninfected roots. Alternatively, when infected roots come into contact with uninfected ones the fungal mycelium may grow across. The rhizomorphs invade the trunk, growing between the bark and the wood and causing wood decay, growth reduction and mortality. Trees that are already under stress are more likely to be attacked but healthy trees may also be parasitized. The foliage becomes sparse and discoloured, twig growth slows down and branches may die back. When they are attacked, the Douglas-fir, western larch and some other conifers often produce an extra large crop of cones shortly before dying. Coniferous trees also tend to ooze resin from infected areas whereas broad-leaved trees sometimes develop sunken cankers. A growth of fruiting bodies near the base of the trunk confirms the suspicion of Armillaria root rot.

In 1893, the American mycologist Charles Horton Peck reported finding Armillaria fruiting bodies that were "aborted", in a similar way to specimens of Entoloma abortivum. It was not until 1974 that Roy Watling showed that the aborted specimens included cells of both Armillaria mellea and Entoloma abortivum. He thought that the Armillaria was parasitizing the Entoloma, a plausible hypothesis given its pathogenic behaviour. However, a 2001 study by Czederpiltz, Volk and Burdsall showed that the Entoloma was in fact the microparasite. The whitish-grey malformed fruit bodies known as carpophoroids were the result of E. abortivum hyphae penetrating the Armillaria and disrupting its normal development.

The main part of the fungus is underground where a mat of mycelial threads may extend for great distances. The rhizomorphs of A. mellea are initiated from mycelium into multicellular apices of rhizomorphs, which are multicellular vegetative organs that exclude soil from the interior of the rhizomorph tissues. The rhizomorphs spread through far greater distances through the ground than the mycelium. The rhizomorphs are black in this species. The fungal body is not bioluminescent but its mycelia and rhizomorphs are luminous when in active growth. A. mellea producing rhizomorphs is parasitic on woody plants of many species, including especially shrubs, hardwood and evergreen trees. In one example, A. mellea spread by rhizomorphs from an initially infected tree killed 600 trees in a prune orchard in 6 years. Each infected tree was immediately adjacent to an already infected one, the spread by rhizomorphs through the tree roots and soil. (Piper and Fletcher, 1903, Wash. Age. Exp. Sat. But., 59:  1-14); cited in Rhizomorph Development in A. mellea, Ph.D. thesis, by Philip Snider(1957), Farlow Herbarium Library Harvard Univ., 20 Divinity Ave., Cambridge, Mass.

Management 
There are no known fungicides or management practices that will kill Armillaria mellea after infection without damaging the infected plant, but there are practices that can extend the life of the plant and prevent further spreading. The best way to extend the plant life is to improve the host condition through supplemental watering and fertilization. To prevent further spread, regulate irrigation to avoid water stress, keep the root collar dry, control defoliating pathogens, remove stumps, fertilize adequately, avoid physical root damage and soil compaction, and don't plant trees that are especially susceptible to the disease in places where Armillaria mellea has been recorded. There is also some evidence that biological control using the fungus genus Trichoderma may help. Trichoderma is a predator of Armillaria mellea and is often found in woodchips. Therefore, chipping or grinding dead and infected roots will give Trichoderma its preferred habitat and help it proliferate. Solarization will also create an ideal habitat as dry soil and higher soil temperatures are preferable for Trichoderma but poor conditions for Armillaria mellea.

Edibility

Armillaria mellea mushroom are considered good edibles, though not preferred by some, and the tough stalks are usually excluded. Some individuals have reported "allergic" reactions that result in stomach upsets. Some authors suggest not collecting mushrooms from the wood of various trees, including hemlock, buckeye, eucalyptus, and locust. They may have been used medicinally by indigenous peoples as a laxative.

The mushrooms have a taste that has been described as slightly sweet and nutty, with a texture ranging from chewy to crunchy, depending on the method of preparation. Parboiling mushrooms before consuming removes the bitter taste present in some specimens, and may reduce the amount of gastrointestinal irritants. According to one guide, they must be cooked before eating. Drying the mushrooms preserves and intensifies their flavour, although reconstituted mushrooms tend to be tough to eat. The mushrooms can also be pickled and roasted.

Chemistry
Several bioactive compounds have been isolated and identified from the fruit bodies. The triterpenes 3β-hydroxyglutin-5-ene,  friedelane-2α,3β-diol, and friedelin were reported in 2011. Indole compounds include tryptamine, L-tryptophan and serotonin.

The fungus produces cytotoxic compounds known as melleolides. Melleolides are made from orsellinic acid and protoilludane sesquiterpene alcohols via esterification. A polyketide synthase gene, termed ArmB, was identified in the genome of the fungus, which was found expressed during melleolide production. The gene shares ca. 42% similarity with the orsellinic acid synthase gene (OrsA) in Aspergillus nidulans. Characterization of the gene proved it to catalyze orsillinic acid in vitro. It is a non-reducing iterative type 1 polyketide synthase. Co-incubation of free orsellinic acid with alcohols and ArmB showed cross-coupling activity. Therefore, the enzyme has transesterification activity. Also, there are other auxiliary factors suspected to control substrate specificity. Additionally, halogen modifications have been observed. Overexpression of annotated halogenases (termed ArmH1-5) and characterization of the subsequent enzymes revealed in all five enzymes the chlorination of mellolide F. In vitro reactions of free standing substrates showed that the enzymes do not require auxiliary carrier proteins for substrate delivery.

Importance 
Armillaria mellea has been reported in almost every state with the continental United States. It is one of the most common causes of death in trees and shrubs in both natural and human cultivated habitats, and cause steady and substantial losses.

Pathogenesis 
Armillaria mellea infects new hosts through rhizomorphs and basidiospores. It is rare for basidiospores to be successful in infecting new hosts and often colonize woody debris instead, but rhizomorphs, however, can grow up to ten feet long in order to find a new host.

See also
 Forest pathology
 List of Armillaria species
 List of bioluminescent fungi

References

External links 

Bioluminescent fungi
mellea
Edible fungi
Fungi described in 1790
Fungi of Africa
Fungi of Asia
Fungi of Europe
Fungi of North America
Parasitic fungi
Fungal grape diseases
Fungal tree pathogens and diseases
Taxa named by Martin Vahl